Richard Marks may refer to:

 Richard Marks (1943–2018), American film editor
 Richard Marks (art historian), a British art historian
 Richard Marks (judge), a British Crown Court judge
 Dick Marks (born 1942), an Australian rugby union player and administrator

See also
 Richard Marx (born 1963), an American singer-songwriter
 Dick Marx (1924–1997), an American jazz pianist, father of Richard Marx
 Mark Richards (disambiguation)